Dakari Naeem Johnson (born September 22, 1995) is an American professional basketball player, who most recently played for the Qingdao Eagles of the Chinese Basketball Association (CBA). He played college basketball for the University of Kentucky.

High school career

Johnson first attended St. Patrick High School in Elizabeth, New Jersey. After the 2010–11 school year, when coach Kevin Boyle left for Montverde Academy, Johnson followed his coach, where he had to sit out the 2011–12 season due to the transfer. Because of his excellent grades, Johnson decided to reclassify, thus making the 2012–13 season his final and senior season at the high school level. He ended up averaging 17.0 points, 11.0 rebounds and 4.3 blocks per game as a senior.  His senior year he garnered USA Today All-American Second-Team for his success.  He subsequently earned selection to the 2013 McDonald's All-American Boys Game and Jordan Brand Classic.

Considered a five-star recruit by ESPN.com, Johnson was ranked as the No. 2 center in the nation in 2013.

College career
As a freshman at Kentucky in 2013–14, Johnson spent the season backing up teammate Julius Randle and averaged 5.2 points and 3.9 rebounds in 39 games. As a sophomore the following season, he again played back-up, this time to freshman big man Karl-Anthony Towns and junior Willie Cauley-Stein. He again appeared in 39 games in 2014–15 and averaged slightly higher numbers with 6.4 points and 4.6 rebounds per game.

On April 9, 2015, Johnson declared for the NBA draft, forgoing his final two years of college eligibility. He was joined alongside fellow Kentucky teammates in Aaron Harrison, Andrew Harrison, Karl-Anthony Towns, Willie Cauley-Stein, Trey Lyles and Devin Booker.

Professional career

Oklahoma City Blue (2015–2017)
On June 25, 2015, Johnson was selected by the Oklahoma City Thunder with the 48th overall pick in the 2015 NBA draft. He later joined the Thunder for the 2015 NBA Summer League where he averaged 7.6 points and 8.6 rebounds in five games. On November 3, 2015, he was acquired by the Oklahoma City Blue of the NBA Development League, the affiliate team of the Thunder. On November 14, he made his professional debut in a 110–104 loss to the Austin Spurs, recording 16 points, nine rebounds, one assist, one steal and one block in 33 minutes. Johnson appeared in all 50 games for the Blue in 2015–16, averaging 12.3 points, 8.1 rebounds, 2.0 assists and 1.6 blocks per game. He subsequently earned NBA D-League All-Rookie Team honors.

Johnson returned to the Blue for the 2016–17 season, and on February 6, 2017, he was named in the Western Conference All-Star team for the 2017 NBA D-League All-Star Game.

Oklahoma City Thunder (2017–2018)
On July 22, 2017, Johnson signed with the Oklahoma City Thunder. He scored four points in his NBA debut on October 19, 2017 in the Thunder's 105–84 win over the New York Knicks.  During his only season with the Oklahoma City Thunder, he started six games for the team where he replaced Steven Adams.  As the starting center for the team they went 5-1 in those games.  Johnson was a plus-26 in point differential in those six games, including a plus-26 in rout to a victory against the Los Angeles Clippers when Johnson held his own against DeAndre Jordan.  Johnson's averages for those six games: 15 minutes, 5.2 points, 2.2 rebounds, 0.3 turnovers, 64.7 percent shooting and 60 percent foul shooting.

On July 20, 2018, Johnson was traded to the Orlando Magic in exchange for Rodney Purvis. Cash considerations were also sent to the Magic. On July 23, 2018, Johnson and the draft rights to Tyler Harvey were traded to the Memphis Grizzlies in exchange for Jarell Martin and cash considerations. On August 31, 2018, Johnson was waived by the Memphis Grizzlies.

Qingdao Eagles (2018–2019)
On September 11, 2018, Johnson was reported to have signed with Qingdao DoubleStar Eagles of the Chinese Basketball Association (CBA).

Anuyi Wenyi (2019) 
On August 23, 2019, Johnson was reported to have played for Anhui Wenyi of the National Basketball League (NBL) and returned with a championship and most valuable player honors.

Return to the Eagles (2019–2022) 
In the 2019-20 season, Johnson averaged 23.7 points, 14.5 rebounds, 3.0 assists and 1.6 blocks per game.

On September 9, 2020, Johnson re-signed with Qingdao.

NBA career statistics

Regular season

|-
| style="text-align:left;"| 
| style="text-align:left;"| Oklahoma City
| 31 || 6 || 5.2 || .564 || – || .550 || 1.1 || .3 || .2 || .3 || 1.8
|- class="sortbottom"
| style="text-align:center;" colspan="2"| Career
| 31 || 6 || 5.2 || .564 || – || .550 || 1.1 || .3 || .2 || .3 || 1.8

Playoffs

|-
| style="text-align:left;"| 2018
| style="text-align:left;"| Oklahoma City
| 2 || 0 || 1.6 || .000 || .000 || .000 || .0 || .0 || .0 || .0 || .0
|- class="sortbottom"
| style="text-align:center;" colspan="2"| Career
| 2 || 0 || 1.6 || .000 || .000 || .000 || .0 || .0 || .0 || .0 || .0

Personal life
Dakari comes from a basketball family in Brooklyn, New York, where he is a third-generation basketball player. His family's basketball legacy started with his grandfather Leslie R. Campbell, best known as Jitu Weusi, who played college basketball at Long Island University. His mother Makini Campbell also played at Long Island University, and his uncle Kojo Campbell played basketball at Stony Brook University.  His brother Kamani Johnson played basketball at Arkansas-Little Rock before transferring to Arkansas.  His cousin Michael Murray  played college basketball at Coppin State University,  where he was selected all-MEAC his senior year. Most recently, Michael played professionally in Spain.

References

External links

Kentucky Wildcats bio

1995 births
Living people
African-American basketball players
American expatriate basketball people in China
American men's basketball players
Basketball players from New York City
Centers (basketball)
Kentucky Wildcats men's basketball players
McDonald's High School All-Americans
Montverde Academy alumni
Oklahoma City Blue players
Oklahoma City Thunder draft picks
Oklahoma City Thunder players
Qingdao Eagles players
Sportspeople from Brooklyn
The Patrick School alumni
United States men's national basketball team players
21st-century African-American sportspeople